Events from the year 1997 in North Korea.

Incumbents
Premier: Kang Song-san (until 21 February), Hong Song-nam (acting) (starting 21 February)
Supreme Leader: Kim Jong-il

Events
1994~1998:Arduous March
April 1997:  Five North Korean soldiers cross the Demilitarized Zone in Cheolwon, Gangwon-do, and fire on South Korean positions.
June 1997:  Three North Korean vessels cross the Northern Limit Line and attack South Korean vessels two miles (3 km) south of the line.  On land, fourteen North Korean soldiers cross 70 m south of the center of the DMZ, leading to a 23-minute exchange of fire.
 North Korean famine

See also
Years in Japan
Years in South Korea

References

 
North Korea
1990s in North Korea
Years of the 20th century in North Korea
North Korea